Carpathonesticus cibiniensis  is an araneomorph spider species of the family Nesticidae. It occurs in Romania, where it can be found in the cellars of old houses.

Original publication

References 

Nesticidae
Spiders described in 1981
Spiders of Europe